Aashirwad (blessing in Hindi) may refer to:

 Aashirwad (film), a 1968 Bollywood film
 Aashirwad (TV series), a Hindi television series